Robert Frantsvog (born May 27, 1941) is an American politician who served as a member of the North Dakota House of Representatives for the 40th District from 2008 to 2016. He is a member of the Republican party.

References

Living people
1941 births
Republican Party members of the North Dakota House of Representatives
21st-century American politicians